Lanesville was a small station on a branch of the  Ulster and Delaware Railroad, five miles from Phoenicia station in Phoenicia in the hamlet of Lanesville. The station was abandoned in 1932 by the New York Central Railroad, having shown little change since it was constructed. The branch Lanesville was on was discontinued in 1940, but the station lasted until the 1960s, when fire brought down the old depot.

Bibliography

References

External links
Ulster and Delaware Railroad Historical Society map

Railway stations in the Catskill Mountains
Former Ulster and Delaware Railroad stations
Railway stations closed in 1940
Railway stations in Greene County, New York
Former railway stations in New York (state)
Railway stations in the United States opened in 1881
1881 establishments in New York (state)